Oswald Hutton Parry was Bishop of Guyana from 1921 until 1936. Born into an eminent ecclesiastical family, he was educated at Charterhouse and Magdalen College, Oxford.  After a curacy at St Ignatius, Sunderland he was appointed  Head of Archbishop's Mission to the Assyrian Christians. From 1907 until 1921 he was Vicar of All Hallows East India Docks when he ascended to the Colonial Episcopate.  A significant author, he died on 28 August 1936.

Notes

1868 births
People educated at Charterhouse School
Alumni of Magdalen College, Oxford
Deans of St George's Cathedral, Georgetown
Anglican bishops of Guyana
20th-century Anglican bishops in the Caribbean
1936 deaths